Blacklight is the fourth studio album by Iris, released on September 3, 2010.

Track listing

Personnel
Iris
 Reagan Jones - vocals, songwriting, keyboards
 Andrew Sega - keyboards, guitars, programming, production

Production
 Ken Porter - mixing and mastering

References

External links
 Blacklight at AllMusic
 Blacklight at Infacted Recordings
 Blacklight at A Different Drum
 Iris return with new album in September, Blackvector Magazine
 Synthpop act Iris return with new album 'Blacklight' in September, Sideline Magazine
 Blacklight review at blackvector.se

Iris (American band) albums
2010 albums